A campfire is a fire at a campsite.

Campfire or Camp Fire may also refer to:

Arts and entertainment
 Campfire (James Blundell album) (2017)
 Campfire (Kasey Chambers album) (2018)
 Campfire (Rend Collective album) (2012)
 "Campfire", a song by Red Velvet from the 2015 album The Red
 "Campfire", a song by DRAM and Neil Young from the soundtrack of 2017 film Bright
 Campfire (film) or Medurat Hashevet, a 2004 Israeli film

Other uses
 Camp Fire (2018), a wildfire in Butte County, California, U.S.
 Camp Fire (organization), an American co-ed youth development organization
 Campfire (horse), an American Thoroughbred racehorse
 Campfire (software), by Basecamp
 Communal Areas Management Programme for Indigenous Resources (CAMPFIRE), in Zimbabwe
 Campfire, a platform around which internet tribes gather

See also
 
 
 
 Bonfire (disambiguation)
 Campfire songs (disambiguation)
 Campfire Girls (band) 
 Camp Fire Girls (novel series)